This article contains information about the literary events and publications of 1510.

Events
c. January – Desiderius Erasmus begins his period of residence in Cambridge (England).
April 10 – Henry Cornelius Agrippa addresses the dedication of De occulta philosophia libri tres to Johannes Trithemius.
Aberdeen Breviary publication completed in Edinburgh, the first full-length book printed in Scotland and the last production of the Chepman and Myllar Press.

New books

Prose
Paolo Cortese – De Cardinalatu
Dinim de shehitah i bedikah (The Rules of Ritual Slaughter and Inspection of Animals) in Constantinople, the earliest known Judaeo-Spanish text, published in Constantinople.
Garci Rodríguez de Montalvo (died c. 1505) – Las sergas de Esplandián (The Adventures of Esplandián)
Ruiz Paez de Ribera – Florisando
probable – Thomas More: The Life of Johan Picus Erle of Myrandula

Poetry

Jean Marot – Voyage de Gênes
Approximate year – Stephen Hawes: , published by Wynkyn de Worde
Between 1510 and 1513 – The Friar and the Boy (fabliau published in English)

Births
unknown dates
Satomura Shōkyū (里村昌休), Japanese master of the linked verse renga (died 1552)
Luigi Tansillo, Italian Marinist Petrarchan poet (died 1568)
probable
Arnoldus Arlenius, Dutch humanist philosopher and poet (died 1582)
Hélisenne de Crenne (probably Marguerite Briet), French novelist and translator (died after 1552)
Sebestyén Tinódi Lantos, Hungarian lyricist, epic poet, political historian and minstrel (died 1556)
Martynas Mažvydas, Lithuanian religious writer (died 1563)
Thomas Phaer, Welsh lawyer, paediatrician and translator (died 1560)
Lope de Rueda, Spanish playwright and author (died 1565)
Robert Wedderburn, Scottish poet (died 1555/60)

Deaths
May 1 – Johannes Nauclerus, Swabian historian (born c. 1425)
August 23 – Ulrich Gering, printer
September (14, 15 or 16) – Saint Catherine of Genoa, mystic (born 1447)
November 11 – Bohuslav Hasištejnský z Lobkovic, Bohemian humanist writer and noble (born 1461)
unknown date – Pothana, Telugu poet (born 1450)

References

1510

1510 books
Years of the 16th century in literature